Dávid Daróczi (né József Daróczi) (April 19, 1972 – April 2, 2010) was a coach and spokesman for former Hungarian Prime Minister Ferenc Gyurcsány and the government from June 2007 to April 2009.

Life
Dávid Daróczi was born on April 19, 1972. His father, József Choli Daróczi (b. 1939), was a decorated Gypsy poet and teacher. Daróczi, an ethnic Roma, had degrees in theology from Pázmány Péter Catholic University and in business marketing from the Budapest University of Technology and Economics. He had worked as a journalist before becoming a government spokesman in 2007, and worked at a communications firm until his death.

Death
He committed suicide in Budapest on April 2, 2010, just 16 days before his 38th birthday. Police did not disclose the method of suicide, only that a preliminary investigation ruled out homicide.

References

Hungarian journalists
Hungarian Romani people
Romani politicians
Government spokespersons of Hungary
1972 births
2010 deaths
Hungarian politicians who committed suicide
Suicides in Hungary